Neil 'Nobby' Clarke (28 August 1957 – 29 March 2003) was an Australian rules footballer who played with Essendon in the Victorian Football League (VFL).

A defender, Clarke was also given many tagging roles during his career. He won Essendon's 'Best Clubman' in their premiership year of 1984 and played 135 VFL games.
Clarke was found dead in his garage in 2003 at the age of 45; he had been known to have been suffering from depression.

References

External links

1957 births
2003 deaths
Australian rules footballers from Victoria (Australia)
Essendon Football Club players
Brunswick Football Club players
Essendon Football Club Premiership players
Victorian State of Origin players
Two-time VFL/AFL Premiership players